Beach volleyball at the 2006 Asian Games was held in Doha, Qatar.

Schedule

Medalists

Medal table

Participating nations
A total of 74 athletes from 19 nations competed in beach volleyball at the 2006 Asian Games:

Final standing

Men

Women

References

Results

External links
Official website – Beach volleyball

 
2006 Asian Games events
Asian Games
2006